Magma is a French progressive rock band founded in Paris in 1969 by self-taught drummer Christian Vander, who claimed as his inspiration a "vision of humanity's spiritual and ecological future" that profoundly disturbed him. In the course of their first album, the band tells the story of a group of people fleeing a doomed Earth to settle on the planet Kobaïa. Later, conflict arises when the Kobaïans—descendants of the original colonists—encounter other Earth refugees. The style of progressive rock that Vander developed with Magma is termed Zeuhl, and has been applied to other bands in France operating in the same period, and to some recent Japanese bands.

Vander created a fictional language, Kobaïan, in which most lyrics are sung. In a 1977 interview with Vander and long-time Magma vocalist Klaus Blasquiz, Blasquiz said that Kobaïan is a "phonetic language made by elements of the Slavonic and Germanic languages to be able to express some things musically. The language has of course a content, but not word by word." Vander himself has said, "When I wrote, the sounds [of Kobaïan] came naturally with it—I didn't intellectualise the process by saying 'Ok, now I'm going to write some words in a particular language', it was really sounds that were coming at the same time as the music." Later albums tell different stories set in more ancient times; however, the Kobaïan language remains an integral part of the music.

In 1986, the French label Seventh Records was founded to (re-)publish Magma's and Vander's work. Over the years, Seventh has also released albums by related artists such as Stella Vander, Patrick Gauthier, and Collectif Mu.

History

Beginnings (1967–1971) 
In early 1967, drummer Christian Vander played in the Wurdalaks and Cruciferius Lobonz, two rhythm and blues bands. With these groups, he wrote his first compositions, "Nogma" and "Atumba". The death of John Coltrane saddened Vander, who left the groups and traveled to Italy. He returned to France in 1969 and met saxophonist René Garber and bassist and conductor Laurent Thibault. Together with singer Lucien Zabuski and organist Francis Moze, they created the group Uniweria Zekt Magma Composedra Arguezdra, shortened to Magma.

After their first tour, Magma experienced significant lineup turnover. Vocalist Lucien Zabuski was replaced with Klaus Blasquiz, and pianist Eddie Rabin, double bassist Jacky Vidal, and guitarist Claude Engel also joined the group. The group worked on material for three months in a house in the Chevreuse Valley. Eddie Rabin was replaced by François Cahen on keyboards, and Laurent Thibault abandoned bass to devote himself to production. Francis Moze became the new bassist. The band also expanded with a brass section, consisting of Teddy Lasry on saxophone and clarinet, Richard Raux on saxophone and flute, and Paco Charlery on trumpet. The group's first album, Magma, was released in the spring of 1970 by Philips Records. The group caused a sensation but audience reactions were mixed.

After the album was released, Claude Engel, Richard Raux, and Paco Charlery left the group. Jeff Seffer replaced Raux on saxophone, and Louis Toesca replaced Charlery on trumpet. Their second album, 1001° Centigrades, was released in April 1971. The album won the band more exposure, including a performance at the Montreux Jazz Festival.

Mëkanïk Dëstruktïẁ Kömmandöh, to Üdü Wüdü (1972–1977) 
In August 1972, Magma released the album The Unnamables, under the alias Univeria Zekt. However, the album sold only 1,500 copies. Many musicians left the band that year, including François Cahen, Louis Toesca, Jeff Seffer, Francis Moze, and Teddy Lasry. That same year, Christian Vander recorded the soundtrack for Yvan Lagrange's film Tristan et Iseult.

In 1973, Vander formed a new lineup of the band, adding Stella Vander as a second vocalist, Claude Olmos on guitar, Jannick Top replacing Francis Moze on bass, René Garber on saxophone and clarinet, and Jean-Luc Manderlier on keyboards, among others. This new version of the band would release their most famous work Mëkanïk Dëstruktïẁ Kömmandöh, which would later become their most acclaimed album, and gave them international fame, including a spot at the prestigious Newport Jazz Festival, their first American performance. In 1974, under Vander's name, the band released a soundtrack album accompanying Yvan Lagrange's 1972 film Tristan et Iseult, also known as Ẁurdah Ïtah; under Magma's name, they followed up with Köhntarkösz, which was successful among fans, but not received as well among the public as Mëkanïk Dëstruktïẁ Kömmandöh. The band would then go on a long, year-and-a-half long tour of France, and after another member shakeup (Bernard Paganotti replacing Jannick Top on bass, Didier Lockwood added as a violinist, Jean-Pol Asseline and Benot Widemann replacing Gerard Bikialo on keyboards, and Gabriel Federow replacing Claude Olmos on guitar), released their first live album, Live / Hhaï, in December 1975, recorded at the Taverne de l'Olympia in Paris.

In 1976, Top briefly rejoined the band for the recording of the album Üdü Ẁüdü, but left soon after due to strained relations with frontman Christian Vander. More lineup turnover followed in 1977, with Jean DeAntoni replacing Gabriel Federow on guitar, Guy Delacroix replacing Bernard Paganotti on bass, and Clement Bailly hired as a second drummer.

Changing sound and breakup (1978–1984) 
In 1978, Magma released the album Attahk. Vying for more commercial success, the album included elements of soul, rhythm & blues, and funk music.

Celebrating 10 years as a band, in 1980, Magma performed three nights at L'Olympia in Paris, with guest appearances from many of the group's past musicians. These were recorded and released as Retrospektïẁ (Parts I+II) and Retrospektïẁ (Part III). The concerts were successful, and allowed Magma to play a number of shows around France, including a three-week residency at Paris's Bobino in 1981, which was recorded and filmed, and later released as Concert Bobino 1981.

In 1984, the band recorded the album Merci, and disbanded shortly afterwards. Christian Vander formed other projects such as Offering, and various jazz projects including the Christian Vander Trio.

Reformation (1996–present) 
While performing as Offering, Vander would occasionally perform Magma songs. In 1989, professional snooker champion Steve Davis convinced Vander to perform a reunion tour (at least six shows) which led Vander to consider reuniting Magma.

After the dissolution of Offering, this was fully realised in 1996 after friend Bernard Ivan asked Vander if he was considering reviving Magma, as he was confident he could get Vander concert dates. Vander agreed, but confessed that he didn't think there would be any remaining interest in the band. Ivan came back to Vander to tell him he fully booked a number of gigs for Magma and Vander, surprised, quickly cobbled a lineup from Offering and friends in the music scene to create a new 14-piece Magma.

Vander decided to revive some sections of tracks he had written back in 1972-1973 while working on Köhntarkösz on this new tour. Eventually, these merged into one big composition K.A (Köhntarkösz Anteria), which released in 2004 to acclaim and surprise at their comeback. K.A is conceptually the prequel to Köhntarkösz, which was then followed up by a sequel Ëmëhntëhtt-Ré in 2009, ending a narrative trilogy between the three albums.

Magma announced that they would officially release their new album Kartëhl on 30 September. The album is a collective work of the band members. The copyright proceeds of the track Dëhndë will be donated to a charity for people with autism.

Magma still tour today.

Kobaïan

Kobaïan is a lyrical language created by French drummer and composer Christian Vander for his progressive rock band Magma. It is the language of Kobaïa, a fictional planet invented by Vander and the setting for a musical "space opera" sung in Kobaïan by Magma on fifteen concept albums.

Development
French drummer and composer Christian Vander formed Magma in late 1969 in an attempt to fill the void left by the death of American jazz musician and composer John Coltrane. Magma's first album, Magma (later reissued as Kobaïa), told a story of refugees fleeing a future Earth and settling on a fictional planet called Kobaïa. The lyrics were all in Kobaïan (except the title track, sung mostly in English), a language Vander constructed for the album, some sung by soloists and others by "massive quasi-operatic choruses". Over the next three decades Magma made a further thirteen albums that continued the mythology of Kobaïa, all sung in Kobaïan.

Vander (his Kobaïan name is Zëbëhn Straïn dë Ğeuštaah) said in an interview that he invented Kobaïan for Magma because "French just wasn't expressive enough. Either for the story or for the sound of the music". He said that the language developed in parallel with the music, that sounds appeared as he was composing on a piano. Vander based Kobaïan in part on elements of Slavic and Germanic languages and in part on the scat-yodeling vocal style of American avant garde jazz singer Leon Thomas. The subsequent expansion of the language became a group effort, and as Magma's personnel changed, so new ideas were incorporated into the language (and the music).

British music critic Ian MacDonald said that Kobaïan is "phonetic, not semantic", and that it is based on "sonorities, not on applied meanings". One of Magma's singers, Klaus Blasquiz, described Kobaïan as "a language of the heart" whose words are "inseparable from the music". Magma expert Michael Draine said "the abstraction provided by the Kobaïan verse seems to inspire Magma's singers to heights of emotional abandon rarely permitted by conventional lyrics".

The Kobaïan lyrics on Magma's albums were generally not translated (though both Kobaïan lyrics and an English translation were provided for the first UK release on A&M of Mëkanïk Dëstruktïẁ Kömmandöh), but clues to the unfolding story of Kobaïa were given in French in the albums' liner notes. While the original intent of the language was to avoid over-scrutiny, unofficial Kobaïan online lexicons were created by Magma fans, and Vander himself has since translated many of the words.

Influence
Christian Vander called Magma's music "Zeuhl" (Kobaïan for "celestial"), and it influenced a number of other (mostly French) bands, including Zao (France), Art Zoyd (France) and Univers Zero (Belgium). Zeuhl later became a music genre which was used to describe music similar to that of Magma. Several Japanese Zeuhl bands also sprang up, including Ruins and Kōenji Hyakkei, whose lyrics are also sung in a constructed language similar to Kobaïan.

Style and influences

Christian Vander has described the style of progressive rock that he developed with Magma in France from 1969 onwards as "zeuhl". Dominique Leone, writing for Pitchfork, says the style is "about what you'd expect an alien rock opera to sound like: massed, chanted choral motifs, martial, repetitive percussion, sudden bursts of explosive improv and just as unexpected lapses into eerie, minimalist trance-rock." The term comes from Kobaïan, the fictional language created by Vander for Magma. He has said that it means celestial; that "Zeuhl music means 'vibratory music'" and that zeuhl is "L'esprit au travers de la matière. That is Zeuhl. Zeuhl is also the sound which you can feel vibrating in your belly. Pronounce the word Zeuhl very slowly, and stress the letter 'z' at the beginning, and you will feel your body vibrating."

Originally applied solely to the music of Magma, the term "zeuhl" was eventually used to describe the similar music produced by French bands beginning in the 1970s. In addition to Magma, bands who are associated with the term include: Happy Family, Kōenji Hyakkei, and Ruins from Japan, and French band Zao.

Vander was musically influenced by John Coltrane and Carl Orff.

Legacy 
The band is widely considered to be musically adventurous and imaginative among music critics. Magma uses choirs extensively in a way reminiscent of the composer Carl Orff. Magma's music is also highly influenced by jazz saxophone player John Coltrane, and Vander has said that "it is still Coltrane who actually gives me the real material to work on, to be able to move on".

Many of the musicians who have played with Magma have also formed solo projects or spinoff acts. The Kobaïan term Zeuhl has come to refer to the musical style of these bands and the French jazz fusion/symphonic rock scene that grew around them. Besides Christian Vander, other well-known Magma alumni include the violinist Didier Lockwood, bassist-composer Jannick "Janik" Top, and spinoff act Weidorje.

Fandom
The band has a number of high-profile fans. Punk rock singer Johnny Rotten, metal musician Kristoffer Rygg, Steven Wilson of Porcupine Tree, Mikael Åkerfeldt of Opeth, Cattle Decapitation vocalist Travis Ryan, magician Penn Jillette, and Chilean filmmaker Alejandro Jodorowsky have all stated their admiration of the band.

In the 1980s, British World champion snooker player Steve Davis declared himself a passionate follower of the band since his youth and used some of his winnings to promote a series of concerts by Magma in London.

Television journalist Antoine de Caunes wrote a biography of the band entitled Magma.

In 2017, documentary filmmaker Laurent Goldstein directed To Life, Death and Beyond – The Music of Magma. Interviewees include Christian Vander, Stella Vander, James MacGaw, Trey Gunn, Robert Trujillo, and Jello Biafra.

Discography

Studio albums
 1970: Magma (reissued as Kobaïa)
 1971: 1001° Centigrades (or Magma 2)
 1973: Mëkanïk Dëstruktïẁ Kömmandöh
 1974: Ẁurdah Ïtah (originally Tristan & Iseult by Christian Vander)
 1974: Köhntarkösz
 1976: Üdü Ẁüdü
 1978: Attahk
 1985: Merci
 1989: Mekanïk Kommandöh (archival, original version of Mëkanïk Dëstruktïẁ Kömmandöh)  
 2004: K.A (Köhntarkösz Anteria)
 2009: Ëmëhntëhtt-Ré
 2012: Félicité Thösz
 2014: Rïah Sahïltaahk
 2015: Šlaǧ Tanƶ
 2019: Zëss
 2022: Kãrtëhl

Live albums
 1975: Live/Hhaï
 1977: Inédits
 1981: Retrospektïẁ (Parts I+II)
 1981: Retrospektïẁ (Part III)
 1989: Akt X: Mekanïk Kommandöh (earlier studio recording of Mekanïk Destruktïw Kommandöh from 1973) [different from the bonus track mentioned above]
 1992: Akt I: Les Voix De Magma (from August 2, 1992 at Douarnenez)
 1994: Akt IV: Theatre Du Taur Concert, 1975 (from September 24, 1975)
 1995: Akt V: Concert Bobino 1981 (from May 16, 1981)
 1996: Akt VIII: Bruxelles 1971 (from November 12, 1971 at Theatre 140)
 1996: Akt IX: Opéra De Reims, 1976 (from March 2, 1976)
 1999: Akt XIII: BBC 1974 Londres (from March 14, 1974 at the London BBC studios)
 2001: Trilogie Theusz Hamtaahk (Concert du Trianon), CD + DVD
 2008: Akt XV: Bourges, 1979 (from April 17, 1979)
 2009: Live in Tokyo 2005
 2014: Zühn Wöhl Ünsai – Live 1974 (2 CD; Radio Bremen recordings)
 2021: Eskähl 2020 (Bordeaux, Toulouse, Perpignan)

EPs
 1998: Floë Ëssi/Ëktah
 2014: Rïah Sahïltaahk
 2015: Šlaǧ Tanƶ

Compilations/boxsets/other material
 1972: The Unnamables (studio album released under the alias "Univeria Zekt")
 1986: Mythes et Légendes Vol. I (compilation)
 1992: Akt II: Sons: Document 1973 (recorded in 1973 at Le Manor, featuring a scaled-back line-up of Christian Vander, Klaus Blasquiz, Jannick Top and René Garber)
 1997: Kompila
 1998: Simples
 2008: Archiẁ I & II (included in the Studio Zünd: 40 Ans d'Evolution boxset)
 2008: Studio Zünd: 40 Ans d'Evolution (12 disc box set, includes Kobaïa to K.A plus Archiẁ I & II)
 2015: Köhnzert Zünd (12 CD; Live recordings, from Magma Live to Trilogie Au Trianon plus Triton Zünd and Alhambra 2009)
 2017: Retrospektïw (3 LPs. Includes Retrospektïw I, II & III series. Limited edition of 1,500 numbered copies. Also includes the comic strip.)

Videos
 1995: Concert Bobino 1981 (Akt VI), DVD (also released on VHS video cassette)
 2001: Trilogie Theusz Hamtaahk (Concert du Trianon), DVD + CD
 2006: Mythes et Légendes Epok 1, DVD
 2006: Mythes et Légendes Epok 2, DVD
 2007: Mythes et Légendes Epok 3, DVD
 2008: Mythes et Légendes Epok 4, DVD
 2013: Mythes et Légendes Epok 5, DVD
 2016: Nihao Hamtaï – Magma in China, DVD
 2017: Ëmëhntëhtt-Rê Trilogy, DVD

Personnel

Members 
 Violinist: Didier Lockwood
 Guitarists: Claude Engel, Claude Olmos, Gabriel Federow, Marc Fosset, James Mac Gaw, Jean-Luc Chevalier (currently guitarist with Tri Yann ), Jim Grandcamp, Rudy Blas, Brian Godding.
 Bassists: Jannick Top, Bernard Paganotti, Guy Delacroix, Francis Moze, Laurent Thibault, Michel Hervé, Dominique Bertram, Marc Éliard (currently bassist with Indochine), Philippe Bussonnet, Jimmy Top
 Keyboardists: Benoît Widemann, Michel Graillier, Gérard Bikialo, Jean Luc Manderlier, François "Faton" Cahen (former leader of the group Zao), Guy Khalifa, Sofia Domancich, Patrick Gauthier, Simon Goubert, Pierre-Michel Sivadier, Jean Pol Asseline, Jean Pierre Fouquey, Frédéric D'Oelsnitz, Benoît Alziari (plus vibraphone and theremin), Emmanuel Borghi, Bruno Ruder, Thierry Eliez
 Saxophonists: Teddy Lasry, Richard Raux, Alain Guillard, René Garber and Jeff "Yochk’o" Seffer
 Trumpeters: Louis Toesca and Yvon Guillard
 Male vocalists: Klaus Blasquiz, Christian Vander, Guy Khalifa, Antoine Paganotti and Hervé Aknin
 Female vocalists: Stella Vander, Isabelle Feuillebois, Maria Popkiewicz, Liza de Luxe, Himiko Paganotti, Sandrine Fougère, Sandrine Destefanis, Sylvie Fisichella, Laura Guarrato
 Drummers and percussionists: Christian Vander, Michel Garrec, Doudou Weiss, Simon Goubert, Clément Bailly, Claude Salmiéri, François Laizeau.

Timeline

See also
 Sound poetry
 Romantic Warriors II: A Progressive Music Saga About Rock in Opposition

References

Reading list

External links

 Seventh Records, Christian Vander's record label
 Utopic Records, Jannick Top's record label
The story of Magma, including the Kobaïa mythology. Perfect Sound Forever.
Unofficial Kobaïan–English Dictionary.
 
 
 

French progressive rock groups
Musical groups established in 1969
Zeuhl
Musical groups from Paris